

NGC 4833 (also known as Caldwell 105) is a globular cluster discovered by Abbe Lacaille during his 1751-1752 journey to South Africa, and catalogued in 1755. It was subsequently observed and catalogued by James Dunlop and Sir John Herschel whose instruments could resolve it into individual stars.

The globular cluster is situated in the very southerly constellation Musca at a distance of 21,200 light years from Earth. It is partially obscured by a dusty region of the galactic plane. After corrections for the reddening by dust, evidence was obtained that it is in the order of 2 billion years older than globular clusters M5 or M92.

See also
 New General Catalogue

References

 CCD Photometry of the Globular Cluster NGC 4833 and Extinction Near the Galactic Plane, Melbourne et al., 25 September 2000, Astrophysical Journal

External links

 Basic information and data
 Photographed by the Antilhue amateur astronomical observatory
 CCD Photometry of the Globular Cluster NGC 4833 and Extinction Near the Galactic Plane
 Position relative to nearby cluster NGC 4372
 

Globular clusters
4833
Musca (constellation)
105b